The Clayton Fire was a wildfire that started on August 13, 2016 just south of Lower Lake in Lake County, California. Damin Pashilk, a construction worker from Clearlake was arrested and facing 17 counts of arson related to the Clayton Fire and other fires.

Events

The fire was first reported at 6:03 pm on August 13 near Highway 29 and Clayton Creek Road. By August 14, the second day, 10 homes had been destroyed and up to 6,000 people had been evacuated from Lower Lake and Clearlake, including St. Helena Hospital Clearlake. An evacuation center was opened at Highlands Senior Center and was evacuated the following day.

Road closures were announced throughout the area, including Clayton Creek Road at Highway 29, Morgan Valley Road, North Spruce Grove Road at Spruce Grove Road, and Jerusalem Grade South Spruce Grove Road. State Route 53 at Highway 29 is closed. New evacuation centers were opened at Twin Pine Casino, Kelseyville High School, and the Seventh-day Adventist Church in Lakeport.

As of August 16, the fourth day, 1,664 fire personnel were on the ground and 20 percent of the fire had been contained. Additionally, the Clearlake area of the Avenues and neighborhoods from Polk Avenue to Cache Creek, east of Highway 53, have been evacuated. A state of emergency was declared for Lake County by California Governor Jerry Brown. A construction worker from Clearlake, Damin Pashilk, was arrested and is currently being held at the Lake County Jail on 17 counts of arson related to the Clayton Fire and other fires in the area.

As of August 24, the fire was 98% contained and had destroyed 300 and damaged 28 buildings, and residents were able to return to their homes.

References

2016 California wildfires
Wildfires in Lake County, California